Doreen Geraldine Knatchbull, Baroness Brabourne,  DStJ (née Lady Doreen Geraldine Browne; 29 May 1896 – 28 August 1979) was an Anglo-Irish aristocrat and socialite. She died as a result of her injuries following an attack by the Provisional IRA in August 1979, when a boat was bombed off the coast of County Sligo. The bomb targeted Lord Louis Mountbatten, who  was also killed in the explosion.

Family life
She was the third daughter of The Most Hon. George Browne, 6th Marquess of Sligo, and his wife, Agatha (née Hodgson), granddaughter of William Forsyth, QC. On 22 January 1919, she married Hon. Michael Knatchbull, a son of Cecil, 4th Baron Brabourne, and his eventual successor.

They had two children:
 Hon. Norton Cecil Michael Knatchbull, later 6th Baron Brabourne (1922–1943)
 Hon. John Ulick Knatchbull, later 7th Baron Brabourne (1924–2005)

On 15 February 1933, her husband succeeded his father as 5th Baron Brabourne and Doreen became The Lady Brabourne. Her husband, Lord Brabourne, served as Governor of Bombay from 1933 until 1937, and then as Governor of Bengal from 1937 until his death.

Death

On 27 August 1979, the Dowager Lady Brabourne was seriously injured in an explosion which killed Lord Mountbatten (the father of her younger son's wife), their teenage grandson Nicholas, and local boy Paul Maxwell, on Donegal Bay, County Sligo. A bomb had been planted in Lord Mountbatten's fishing boat by a member of the Provisional IRA. Lady Brabourne died in hospital from her injuries the next day.

Commemoration
Her name is commemorated by the eponymous Lady Brabourne College, which was established in 1939 as the first women's college for Muslim women in Calcutta, India.  She took the initiative in establishing this institution following complaints from Muslim girls that they were discriminated against by the Hindu establishment at the elite Bethune College, which is incidentally the first women's college in India.

References
 lordmountbattenofburma.com - Tribute & Memorial web-site to Louis, 1st Earl Mountbatten of Burma

1896 births
Mass murder victims
1979 deaths
Brabourne
Doreen
Companions of the Order of the Crown of India
Dames of Grace of the Order of St John
People killed by the Provisional Irish Republican Army
Deaths by improvised explosive device in the Republic of Ireland
British terrorism victims
Daughters of British marquesses
People murdered in the Republic of Ireland
British people murdered abroad
Terrorism deaths in the Republic of Ireland
Founders of Indian schools and colleges
1979 murders in the Republic of Ireland